Burak Uygur (born April 14, 1995) is a European and European Games champion Turkish karateka competing in the kumite 67 kg division. He is a member of İstanbul Büyükşehir Belediyesi S.K.

Achievements
2015
  1st European Games – 13 June, Baku, AZE – kumite 67 kg
  European Championships – 19 March, Istanbul, TUR – kumite 67 kg
2017
  European Championships – 6 May, İzmit, TUR – kumite 67 kg

References

1995 births
Turkish male karateka
European Games medalists in karate
European Games gold medalists for Turkey
Living people
Karateka at the 2015 European Games
European champions for Turkey
Competitors at the 2018 Mediterranean Games
Competitors at the 2022 Mediterranean Games
Mediterranean Games silver medalists for Turkey
Mediterranean Games medalists in karate
Karateka at the 2019 European Games